Conulus is an extinct genus of echinoids (sea urchins) that lived in the Cretaceous. Remains of Conulus species have been found in Asia, Europe, and North America.

Species
The following species are recognised in the genus Conulus:

 †Conulus angulatus 
 †Conulus azerbaidjanensis 
 †Conulus campaniformis 
 †Conulus castaneus 
 †Conulus chiapasensis 
 †Conulus chiesai 
 †Conulus cookei 
 †Conulus cubensis 
 †Conulus djanelidzei 
 †Conulus grauensis 
 †Conulus isopyramidatus 
 †Conulus kubatliensis 
 †Conulus lamberti 
 †Conulus matesovi 
 †Conulus mixtus 
 †Conulus mullerriedi 
 †Conulus parravanoi 
 †Conulus praenuntius 
 †Conulus rothomagensis 
 †Conulus sanfilippoi 
 †Conulus sinensis 
 †Conulus stephensoni 
 †Conulus subpyramidatus 
 †Conulus subrotundus 
 †Conulus tradis 
 †Conulus zinai

References

 David Ward, Fossils, Smithsonian Handbooks, p. 180
Conulus, Paleobiology Database, accessed 24 January 2011

Echinoneoida
Prehistoric echinoid genera
Cretaceous echinoderms of Asia
Cretaceous echinoderms of Europe
Cretaceous echinoderms of North America